The Rupperswil–Immensee railway line is a railway line in the cantons of Aargau and Zug, in Switzerland. The line runs north-south and interchanges with several other lines, including the Baden–Aarau, Heitersberg, Zofingen–Wettingen, Seetal, Brugg–Hendschiken, Bremgarten–Dietikon, Zug–Lucerne, and finally the Lucerne–Immensee and Gotthard at Immensee. The Aargau Southern Railway opened the line in stages between 1874 and 1882 and it has belonged to Swiss Federal Railways since 1902.

History 
The line was extended south from Wohlen to  a year later, on 1 June 1875. The extension from Muri to  opened on 1 December 1881.

The line passed to Swiss Federal Railways (SBB) in 1902 after the Aargau Southern Railway, along with its corporate parents the Swiss Central Railway and Swiss Northeastern Railway, were nationalized. The Rotkreuz–Rupperswil portion was electrified on 5 May 1927. The line was double-tracked in stages between 1930–1972.

Route 
The line begins at Rupperswil, where it connects with the Baden–Aarau line. It continues east to  where another former Aargau Southern line, the Brugg–Hendschiken terminates. From Hendschiken the line runs north-south. At Wohlen AG there is an interchange with the  Bremgarten–Dietikon line, originally a standard gauge line of the Aargau Southern. Continuing from Wohlen, the line reaches Rotkreuz and a junction with the Zug–Lucerne line. From Rotkreuz, the line follows the left bank of Lake Zug to Immensee, where it terminates. Immensee is also the eastern terminus of the Lucerne–Immensee line and the northern terminus of the Gotthard line.

Operations 
No regular passenger service covers the entirety of the line. At the north end of the line, the Aargau S-Bahn S23 uses the line between Rupperswil and Lenzburg, while the S25 provides hourly service between Hendschiken and Muri. In addition, the rush-hour S42 of the Zürich S-Bahn, which operates between Muri and Zürich Hauptbahnhof, uses the line between Muri and Hendschiken.

Local passenger service between Rotkreuz and Immensee ended in 1996. Reconstruction of the Thalwil–Arth-Goldau line led to the temporary diversion of long-distance traffic over the Rotkreuz–Immensee section between 2019–2020. Dubbed the Südbahn-Express (Southern Railway Express), the trains have connections to Ticino via either the traditional Gotthard line or the newer Gotthard Base Tunnel.

Notes

References

External links 

 2021 timetable

1874 establishments in Switzerland
Railway lines opened in 1874
Railway lines in Switzerland
15 kV AC railway electrification